Hal Dominic Bart Cruttenden (born 9 September 1969) is an English stand-up comedian, actor, presenter, and writer.

Early life
Hal Dominic Bart Cruttenden was born in the Ealing district of London on 9 September 1969. He is the younger brother of actress Abigail Cruttenden. He was educated at St Paul's School in London's Barnes district at the same time as future Chancellor of the Exchequer George Osborne, then joined the University of York.

Career
Cruttenden studied acting and had small roles on shows such as EastEnders and Kavanagh QC in the 1990s, as well as voicing BBC radio traffic reports. Despite nervousness, he performed stand-up comedy for the first time at the age of 27. He has appeared on Mock the Week, Live at the Apollo, Have I Got News for You, The 11 O'Clock Show, Richard Herring's Leicester Square Podcast, The Great British Bake Off: An Extra Slice, Pointless Celebrities, and Richard Osman's House of Games. He has also written for The Omid Djalili Show and The Rob Brydon Show. He was nominated for Best Newcomer at the 2002 Edinburgh Comedy Awards.

Personal life
Cruttenden married Dawn Coulter, a Northern Irish artist from Derry, in 2000, they divorced in 2022.  They have two daughters, born in 2000 and 2002.

References

External links

 
 

1969 births
Living people
Alumni of the University of York
Comedians from London
English male comedians
People educated at St Paul's School, London
People from Ealing
20th-century English comedians
21st-century English comedians